Sandor Vago (1887–1946) was a Hungarian-American painter.

Biography
He was born in Hungary. After  studying art in Budapest, Hungary, he completed his studies in Munich, Germany. Before World War I, the painter exhibited his artworks in Hungary as well as in other European countries, including Vienna, Austria and Venice, Italy. In 1921 he immigrated to the US and established his workshop in Cleveland, Ohio. There, he became a member of the local Society of Artists. Initially a painter of still lifes and landscapes, Vago became a successful portrait painter after his move to the US, receiving orders from private collectors and public institutions including the City of Cleveland. Vago taught at the Cleveland Institute of Art from 1929 to 1935.

He became a core member of the Cleveland School, a flourishing community started by artists exhibiting and working in the Cleveland area.

Sandor Vago died in 1946.

Salons
 Cleveland Museum of Art May Show, 1922 to 1947
 Cleveland Society of Artists

Artworks in public collections
 Portrait of John G. White, 100x130cm, Art collection, The Cleveland Public Library
 Flower still-life, 1924, 66x86cm, oil on canvas, Cleveland Museum of Art
 Self-Portrait, 1937, 93x103cm, oil on canvas, Cleveland Museum of Art

Notes

Sources
 Akoun 2004, la Cote de l'Amateur publishing

External links
 the Cleveland Public Library Art Collection
 Portrait of Sandor Vago

1887 births
1946 deaths
20th-century American painters
American male painters
Modern painters
20th-century American male artists
Hungarian emigrants to the United States